Cham-e Borzu (also Romanized as Cham-e Borzū and Cham Borzū) is a village in Zirtang Rural District, Kunani District, Kuhdasht County, Lorestan Province, Iran. At the 2006 census, its population was 410, in 71 families.

References 

Towns and villages in Kuhdasht County